I'm in Love is the sixteenth album by American singer Melba Moore. It was by Capitol Records on released in June 1, 1988. The album peaked at number 45 on the US Top R&B/Hip-Hop Albums chart.

Critical reception
{{Album ratings
| rev1 = Allmusic
| rev1Score = <ref name="allmusic">{{cite web|url=https://www.allmusic.com/album/im-in-love-mw0000652451|title=I'm in Love|work=Allmusic|accessdate=2021-11-15}}</ref>}}
AllMusic rated I'm in Love'' three out of five stars.

Track listing

Notes
 denotes associate production

Charts

References

1988 albums
Melba Moore albums
Capitol Records albums